Live at the Foxes Den is a 2013 drama film. It marks the directorial debut for Michael Kristoff, and stars Jackson Rathbone, Jocelin Donahue, Jack Holmes, Pooch Hall, Brian Doyle-Murray, Bob Gunton and Elliott Gould. It was shot in the greater Los Angeles area and was released on December 6, 2013. Den tells the story of a young and disenchanted lawyer, Bobby (Rathbone), who after a night of debauchery decides to leave his job at a prestigious law firm to sing in a lounge called "The Foxes Den." Songs from Frank Sinatra, Jack Jones and others are featured in "The Foxes Den" as is original music penned by star and co-writer, Jack Holmes. Kevin Mann, Peer Pedersen and Matthew Perniciaro serve as executive producers. Adam Gibbs and Roger Pugliese produced the film.

References 
 Kroll, Justin (June 2, 2011). "Jocelin Donahue digs 'Foxes Den'", Variety.com

External links 

American drama films
2013 films
2013 drama films
2010s English-language films
2010s American films